Paul Huber may refer to:
Paul Huber (physicist) (1910-1971), Swiss-American physicist
Paul B. Huber (1934-2021), American economist